The WXW Television Championship is a professional wrestling title created in 1996 as part of Top Rope Productions and World Xtreme Wrestling when the promotion was renamed in 1998.

Title history
Key

List of combined reigns

References

External links
Top Rope Productions Title Histories 

World Xtreme Wrestling championships
Television wrestling championships